Nayoroiwa Shizuo (名寄岩静男, September 27, 1914 – January 26, 1971) was a Japanese sumo wrestler from Nayoro, Hokkaidō, Japan.

Career
He joined Tatsunami stable and made his professional debut in May 1932. Along with his stablemates Futabayama and Haguroyama, he supported Tatsunami stable. In January 1937, he was promoted to the top makuuchi division. In January 1938, he defeated yokozuna Musashiyama, gaining  his first kinboshi or gold star. He was promoted to ōzeki in January 1943, but was demoted to sekiwake in May 1944. He was promoted to ōzeki again in November 1946, but he lost all eleven bouts in the November 1947 tournament. He was demoted again in the May 1948 tournament. Of his six tournaments at ozeki rank he only achieved a kachi-koshi or winning record in two of them, and his overall record as an ozeki was 26 wins against 31 losses, with 22 absences.

In the May 1950 tournament, he won his first Fighting Spirit Award. In the September 1952 tournament, he defeated yokozuna Chiyonoyama, gaining a kinboshi and winning his second Fighting Spirit Award. In January 1953 he returned to sekiwake, and he remains the oldest man in the post-war era to be promoted to a san'yaku rank. During the Autumn 1954 tournament which held from September 19 to October 3, he reached his fortieth birthday, and after the tournament he retired from an active wrestler after 22 years in sumo.

After his retirement, he re-established the Kasugayama stable, which he ran until his death in 1971. Among his rikishi was the former maegashira Onobori.

Career record
Through most of the 1930s and 1940s only two tournaments were held a year, and in 1946 only one was held. The New year tournament began and the Spring tournament returned to Osaka in 1953.

See also
Glossary of sumo terms
List of past sumo wrestlers
List of ōzeki

References

External links
Tournament results

Japanese sumo wrestlers
Sumo people from Hokkaido
1914 births
1971 deaths
Ōzeki